Appletreehall is a village in the Scottish Borders area of Scotland, 2 miles north-east of Hawick, in the historic county of Roxburghshire.

Nearby are Branxholme, Broadhaugh, Roberton, Wilton and Wilton Dean.

See also
List of places in the Scottish Borders
List of places in Scotland

References
 NMS (1995c), 'Appletreehall, Hawick (Hawick parish), Romano-British sculptured figure of deity', Discovery Excav Scot National Museums of Scotland, page 9

External links

CANMORE/RCAHMS record of Hawick, Appletreehall
Geograph image: Road leading to Appletreehall
Photographs of Hawick, with road bridge between Appletreehall crossroads and the A698
E-book: Manuscripts of the duke of Athole, K.T., and of the Earl of Home

Villages in the Scottish Borders